The Cyber and Information Domain Service (CIR) is the youngest branch of Germany's military, the Bundeswehr. The decision to form a new  military branch was presented by Defense Minister Ursula von der Leyen on 26 April 2016, becoming operational on 1 April 2017. The headquarter of the Cyber and Information Domain Service is Bonn.

History 
In November 2015, the German Ministry of Defense activated a Staff Group within the ministry tasked with developing plans for a reorganization of the Cyber, IT, military intelligence, geo-information, and operative communication units of the Bundeswehr.

On 26 April 2016, Defense Minister Ursula von der Leyen  presented the plans for the new military branch to the public and on 5 October 2016 the command's staff became operational as a department within the ministry of defense. On 1 April 2017, the Cyber and Information Domain Service was activated as the 6th branch of the Bundeswehr. The Cyber and Information Domain Service Headquarters will take command of all existing Cyber, IT, military intelligence, geoinformation, and operative communication units. The Command is planned to be fully operational by 2021.

Organisation 
The CIDS is commanded by the Chief of the Cyber and Information Domain Service (InspCIR), a three-star general position, based in Bonn.

 Chief CIDS and Commander CIDS HQ
 Deputy Commander CIDS HQ and Chief of Staff
 Command Staff
 Operations Staff
 Planning Staff
  Cyber and Information Domain Service Command ( KdoCIR), in Bonn
  Strategic Reconnaissance Command ( KSA), in Gelsdorf
  911th Electronic Warfare Battalion
  912th Electronic Warfare Battalion, mans the Oste-class SIGINT/ELINT and reconnaissance ships
  931st Electronic Warfare Battalion
  932nd Electronic Warfare Battalion, provides airborne troops for operations in enemy territory
  Bundeswehr Strategic Reconnaissance School
 Bundeswehr Operational Communications Center
 Cyber-Operations Center
 Electronic Warfare Analysis Center
 Central Imaging Reconnaissance, operating the SAR-Lupe satellites
  Central Bundeswehr Investigation Authority for Technical Reconnaissance
  Bundeswehr Geoinformation Centre, in Euskirchen
  Information Technology Command, in Bonn
  Bundeswehr IT Operations Center
  Bundeswehr Information Technology School
  281st Information Technology Battalion
  282nd Information Technology Battalion
  292nd Information Technology Battalion
  293rd Information Technology Battalion
  381st Information Technology Battalion
  383rd Information Technology Battalion
 Bundeswehr Cyber-Security Center
 Bundeswehr Software Competence Center

See also
 List of cyber warfare forces

References

External links 
 Cyber security, the German way
 Dossier on cyber security in the Bundeswehr
 White Paper on German security policy and the future of the Bundeswehr
 The Faculty of Joint Operations

Bundeswehr
Information operations units and formations
Computer security